Highway 52 is a highway in the Canadian province of Saskatchewan. It runs from Highway 15 / Highway 310 near Ituna to Highway 10A in Yorkton near Pleasant Heights.

Highway 52 connects with Highways 617, 651, and 47. The communities of Homefield, Willowbrook, Fonehill, Vanstone, and Collacott are near the highway between Highway 15 and Yorkton.

History
The section of Highway 52 between Yorkton and Willowbrook was originally part of Highway 10, which then continued south to Melville along present-day Highway 47. The designation was changed when a more direct highway was constructed in the 1960s.

Major intersections

Highway 52A

Highway 52A is a highway in the Canadian province of Saskatchewan. It runs from Highway 52 to Highway 16 along the western edge of Yorkton.

References

052
Transport in Yorkton